Henry Lygon, 5th Earl Beauchamp (13 February 1829 – 4 March 1866), styled Viscount Elmley between 1853 and 1863, was a British politician.

Background
Beauchamp was the second but eldest surviving son of General Henry Lygon, 4th Earl Beauchamp, by his wife Lady Susan Caroline, daughter of William Eliot, 2nd Earl of St Germans.

Career
Lygon served in the 1st Life Guards. He purchased a commission as a lieutenant on 5 May 1848, succeeding Hon. Dudley FitzGerald-deRos. That year, he became a cornet. He achieved the rank of captain in 1854. In 1853 he succeeded his father as Member of Parliament for Worcestershire West, a seat he held until 1863, when he succeeded his father in the earldom and entered the House of Lords.

Personal life
Lord Beauchamp spent much of his life abroad. A homosexual, he never married. He died from tuberculosis in London in March 1866, aged 37. He was succeeded in his titles by his younger brother, Frederick.

References

External links 
 

1829 births
1866 deaths
Henry 5
Henry
Members of the Parliament of the United Kingdom for English constituencies
UK MPs 1852–1857
UK MPs 1857–1859
UK MPs 1859–1865
Beauchamp, E5